Several ships have been named  :

 JDS Maki (PF-18, PF-298), a Kusu-class patrol frigate of the Japan Maritime Self-Defense Force, formerly USS Bath (PF-55)

See also
 Maki (disambiguation)

Imperial Japanese Navy ship names
Japanese Navy ship names